Demba is one of the five territories in Kasai-Central province of the Democratic Republic of the Congo.

References 

Territories of Kasaï-Central Province